

Events

Pre-1600
1527 – Spanish and German troops sack Rome; many scholars consider this the end of the Renaissance.
1536 – The Siege of Cuzco commences, in which Incan forces attempt to retake the city of Cuzco from the Spanish.
1541 – King Henry VIII orders English-language Bibles be placed in every church. In 1539 the Great Bible would be provided for this purpose.
1542 – Francis Xavier reaches Old Goa, the capital of Portuguese India at the time.
1593 – The Dutch city of Coevorden held by the Spanish, falls to a Dutch and English force.

1601–1900
1659 – English Restoration: A faction of the British Army removes Richard Cromwell as Lord Protector of the Commonwealth and reinstalls the Rump Parliament.
1682 – Louis XIV of France moves his court to the Palace of Versailles.
1757 – Battle of Prague: A Prussian army fights an Austrian army in Prague during the Seven Years' War.
  1757   – The end of Konbaung–Hanthawaddy War, and the end of Burmese Civil War (1740–1757).
  1757   – English poet Christopher Smart is admitted into St Luke's Hospital for Lunatics in London, beginning his six-year confinement to mental asylums.
1782 – Construction begins on the Grand Palace, the royal residence of the King of Siam in Bangkok, at the command of King Buddha Yodfa Chulaloke.
1801 – Captain Thomas Cochrane in the 14-gun  captures the 32-gun Spanish frigate El Gamo.
1835 – James Gordon Bennett, Sr. publishes the first issue of the New York Herald.
1840 – The Penny Black postage stamp becomes valid for use in the United Kingdom of Great Britain and Ireland.
1857 – The East India Company disbands the 34th Regiment of Bengal Native Infantry whose sepoy Mangal Pandey had earlier revolted against the British in the lead up to the War of Indian Independence.
1861 – American Civil War: Arkansas secedes from the Union.
1863 – American Civil War: The Battle of Chancellorsville ends with the defeat of the Army of the Potomac by the Army of Northern Virginia.
1877 – Chief Crazy Horse of the Oglala Lakota surrenders to United States troops in Nebraska.
1882 – Thomas Henry Burke and Lord Frederick Cavendish are stabbed to death by Fenian assassins in Phoenix Park, Dublin.
  1882   – The United States Congress passes the Chinese Exclusion Act.
1889 – The Eiffel Tower is officially opened to the public at the Universal Exposition in Paris.

1901–present
1901 – The first issue of Gorkhapatra, the oldest still running state-owned Nepali newspaper was published.
1906 – The Russian Constitution of 1906 is adopted (on April 23 by the Julian calendar).
1910 – George V becomes King of Great Britain, Ireland, and many overseas territories, on the death of his father, Edward VII.
1915 – Babe Ruth, then a pitcher for the Boston Red Sox, hits his first major league home run.
  1915   – Imperial Trans-Antarctic Expedition: The SY Aurora broke loose from its anchorage during a gale, beginning a 312-day ordeal.
1916 – Twenty-one Lebanese nationalists are executed in Martyrs' Square, Beirut by Djemal Pasha.
  1916   – Vietnamese Emperor Duy Tân is captured while calling upon the people to rise up against the French, and is later deposed and exiled to Réunion island.
1933 – The Deutsche Studentenschaft attacked Magnus Hirschfeld's Institut für Sexualwissenschaft, later burning many of its books.
1935 – New Deal: Under the authority of the newly-enacted Federal Emergency Relief Administration, President Franklin D. Roosevelt issues Executive Order 7034 to create the Works Progress Administration.
1937 – Hindenburg disaster: The German zeppelin Hindenburg catches fire and is destroyed within a minute while attempting to dock at Lakehurst, New Jersey. Thirty-six people are killed.
1940 – John Steinbeck is awarded the Pulitzer Prize for his novel The Grapes of Wrath.
1941 – At California's March Field, Bob Hope performs his first USO show.
  1941   – The first flight of the Republic P-47 Thunderbolt.
1942 – World War II: On Corregidor, the last American forces in the Philippines surrender to the Japanese.
1945 – World War II: Axis Sally delivers her last propaganda broadcast to Allied troops.
  1945   – World War II: The Prague Offensive, the last major battle of the Eastern Front, begins.
1949 – EDSAC, the first practical electronic digital stored-program computer, runs its first operation.
1954 – Roger Bannister becomes the first person to run the mile in under four minutes.
1960 – More than 20 million viewers watch the first televised royal wedding when Princess Margaret marries Anthony Armstrong-Jones at Westminster Abbey.
1966 – Myra Hindley and Ian Brady are sentenced to life imprisonment for the Moors murders in England.
1972 – Deniz Gezmiş, Yusuf Aslan and Hüseyin İnan are executed in Ankara after being convicted of attempting to overthrow the Constitutional order.
1975 – During a lull in fighting, 100,000 Armenians gather in Beirut for the 60th anniversary commemorations of the Armenian genocide.
1976 – The 6.5  Friuli earthquake affected Northern Italy with a maximum Mercalli intensity of X (Extreme), leaving 900–978 dead and 1,700–2,400 injured.
1983 – The Hitler Diaries are revealed as a hoax after being examined by new experts.
1984 – One hundred and three Korean Martyrs are canonized by Pope John Paul II in Seoul.
1988 – All thirty-six passengers and crew were killed when Widerøe Flight 710 crashed into Mt. Torghatten in Brønnøy.
1994 – Elizabeth II of the United Kingdom and French President François Mitterrand officiate at the opening of the Channel Tunnel.
1996 – The body of former CIA director William Colby is found washed up on a riverbank in southern Maryland, eight days after he disappeared.
1997 – The Bank of England is given independence from political control, the most significant change in the bank's 300-year history.
1998 – Kerry Wood strikes out 20 Houston Astros to tie the major league record held by Roger Clemens. He threw a one-hitter and did not walk a batter in his fifth career start.
1998 – Steve Jobs of Apple Inc. unveils the first iMac.
1999 – The first elections to the devolved Scottish Parliament and Welsh Assembly are held.
2001 – During a trip to Syria, Pope John Paul II becomes the first pope to enter a mosque.
2002 – Dutch politician Pim Fortuyn is assassinated following a radio-interview at the Mediapark in Hilversum.
  2002   – Founding of SpaceX.
2010 – In just 36 minutes, the Dow-Jones average plunged nearly 1,000 points in what is known as the 2010 Flash Crash.
2013 – Three women, kidnapped and missing for more than a decade, are found alive in Cleveland, Ohio, in the United States.

Births

Pre-1600
 973 – Henry II, Holy Roman Emperor (d. 1024)
1464 – Sophia Jagiellon, Margravine of Brandenburg-Ansbach, Polish princess (d. 1512)
1493 – Girolamo Seripando, Italian theologian and cardinal (d. 1563)
1501 – Marcellus II, pope of the Catholic Church (d. 1555)
1574 – Innocent X, pope of the Catholic Church (d. 1655)
1580 – Charles Gonzaga, Duke of Mantua and Montferrat, French noble (d. 1637)

1601–1900
1635 – Johann Joachim Becher, German physician and alchemist (d. 1682)
1668 – Alain-René Lesage, French author and playwright (d. 1747)
1680 – Jean-Baptiste Stuck, Italian-French cellist and composer (d. 1755)
1713 – Charles Batteux, French philosopher and academic (d. 1780)
1714 – Anton Raaff, German tenor (d. 1797)
1742 – Jean Senebier, Swiss pastor and physiologist (d. 1809)
1758 – André Masséna, French general (d. 1817)
  1758   – Maximilien Robespierre, French politician (d. 1794)
1769 – Ferdinand III, Grand Duke of Tuscany (d. 1824)
  1769   – Jean Nicolas Pierre Hachette, French mathematician and academic (d. 1834)
1781 – Karl Christian Friedrich Krause, German philosopher and author (d. 1832)
1797 – Joseph Brackett, American religious leader and composer (d. 1882)
1800 – Roman Sanguszko, Polish general (d. 1881)
1827 – Hermann Raster, German-American journalist and politician (d. 1891)
1836 – Max Eyth, German engineer and author (d. 1906)
1843 – Grove Karl Gilbert, American geologist and academic (d. 1918)
1848 – Henry Edward Armstrong, English chemist and academic (d. 1937)
1851 – Aristide Bruant, French singer and actor (d. 1925)
1856 – Sigmund Freud, Austrian neurologist and psychoanalyst (d. 1939)
  1856   – Robert Peary, American admiral and explorer (d. 1920)
1861 – Motilal Nehru, Indian lawyer and politician, President of the Indian National Congress (d. 1931)
1868 – Gaston Leroux, French journalist and author (d. 1927)
1869 – Junnosuke Inoue, Japanese businessman and central banker, 8th and 11th Governor of the Bank of Japan (d. 1932)
1870 – Walter Rutherford, Scottish golfer (d. 1936)
1871 – Victor Grignard, French chemist and academic, Nobel Prize laureate (d. 1935)
  1871   – Christian Morgenstern, German author and poet (d. 1914)
1872 – Willem de Sitter, Dutch mathematician, physicist, and astronomer (d. 1934)
  1872   – Djemal Pasha, Ottoman general (d. 1922)
1879 – Bedřich Hrozný, Czech orientalist and linguist (d. 1952)
  1879   – Hendrik van Heuckelum, Dutch footballer (d. 1929)
1880 – Winifred Brunton, English-South African painter and illustrator (d. 1959)
  1880   – Ernst Ludwig Kirchner, German-Swiss painter (d. 1938)
1883 – Alberto Collo, Italian actor (d. 1955) 
1895 – Júlio César de Mello e Souza, Brazilian mathematician and author (d. 1974)
  1895   – Fidél Pálffy, Hungarian soldier and politician, Hungarian Minister of Agriculture (d. 1946)
  1895   – Rudolph Valentino, Italian actor (d. 1926)
1896 – Rolf Maximilian Sievert, Swedish physicist and academic (d. 1966)
1897 – Paul Alverdes, German author and poet (d. 1979)
1898 – Konrad Henlein, Czech soldier and politician (d. 1945)

1901–present
1902 – Harry Golden, Ukrainian-American journalist and author (d. 1981)
  1902   – Max Ophüls, German-American director and screenwriter (d. 1957)
1903 – Toots Shor, American businessman, founded Toots Shor's Restaurant (d. 1977)
1904 – Moshé Feldenkrais, Ukrainian-Israeli physicist and academic (d. 1984)
  1904   – Catherine Lacey, English actress (d. 1979)
  1904   – Harry Martinson, Swedish novelist, essayist, and poet Nobel Prize laureate (d. 1978)
1905 – Philip N. Krasne, American lawyer and producer (d. 1999)
1906 – André Weil, French mathematician and academic (d. 1998)
1907 – Peter Barnes, Executed Irish Republican (d. 1940) 
  1907   – Weeb Ewbank, American football player and coach (d. 1998)
1911 – Guy des Cars, French journalist and author (d. 1993)
1913 – Carmen Cavallaro, American pianist (d. 1989)
  1913   – Stewart Granger, English-American actor (d. 1993)
1915 – Orson Welles, American actor, director, producer, and screenwriter (d. 1985)
  1915   – Theodore H. White, American historian, journalist, and author (d. 1986)
1916 – Robert H. Dicke, American physicist and astronomer (d. 1997)
1917 – Kal Mann, American songwriter (d. 2001)
1918 – Zayed bin Sultan Al Nahyan, emir of Abu Dhabi and first president of the United Arab Emirates (d. 2004)
1919 – André Guelfi, French race car driver (d. 2016)
1920 – Kamisese Mara, Fijian politician, 1st Prime Minister of Fiji (d. 2004)
  1920   – Marguerite Piazza, American soprano and actress (d. 2012)
1921 – Erich Fried, Austrian-German author, poet, and translator (d. 1988)
1922 – Camille Laurin, Canadian psychiatrist and politician, 7th Deputy Premier of Quebec (d. 1999)
1923 – Harry Watson, Canadian ice hockey player and coach (d. 2002)
1924 – Nestor Basterretxea, Spanish painter and sculptor (d. 2014)
  1924   – Patricia Helen Kennedy, American socialite, activist, and author (d. 2006)
  1924   – Denny Wright, English guitarist, composer, and producer (d. 1992)
1926 – Gilles Grégoire, Canadian politician, co-founded the Parti Québécois (d. 2006)
1929 – Rosemary Cramp, English archaeologist and academic
  1929   – Paul Lauterbur, American chemist and biophysicist, Nobel Prize laureate (d. 2007)
  1929   – John Taylor, English bishop and theologian (d. 2016)
1931 – Willie Mays, American baseball player and coach
  1931   – Louis Gambaccini, American government official (d. 2018)
1932 – Ahmet Haxhiu, Kosovan activist (d. 1994)
  1932   – Alexander Thynn, 7th Marquess of Bath, English lieutenant and politician (d. 2020)
1934 – Richard Shelby, American lawyer and politician
1937 – Rubin Carter, American-Canadian boxer (d. 2014)
1938 – Jean Garon, Canadian economist, lawyer, and politician (d. 2014)
1939 – Eddie C. Campbell, American singer and guitarist (d. 2018)
  1939   – Chet Allen, American child actor (d. 1984)
1942 – Ariel Dorfman, Argentinian author, playwright, and academic
1943 – Andreas Baader, German terrorist, co-founded the Red Army Faction (d. 1977)
  1943   – Milton William Cooper, American conspiracy theorist and author (d. 2001)
  1943   – Wolfgang Reinhardt, German pole vaulter (d. 2011)
  1943   – James Turrell, American sculptor and illustrator
1944 – Anton Furst, English-American production designer and art director (d. 1991)
  1944   – Masanori Murakami, Japanese baseball player and coach 
1945 – Jimmie Dale Gilmore, American country singer-songwriter, guitarist, actor, and producer
  1945   – Bob Seger, American singer-songwriter and guitarist
1947 – Alan Dale, New Zealand actor
  1947   – Martha Nussbaum, American philosopher and author
  1947   – Ljubomir Vračarević, Serbian martial artist, founded Real Aikido (d. 2013)
1948 – Frankie Librán, Puerto Rican-American baseball player (d. 2013)
1950 – Jeffery Deaver, American journalist and author
1951 – Samuel Doe, Liberian sergeant and politician, 21st President of Liberia (d. 1990)
1952 – Chiaki Mukai, Japanese physician and astronaut
  1952   – Gerrit Zalm, Dutch economist and politician, Deputy Prime Minister of the Netherlands
1953 – Alexander Akimov, Ukrainian Chernobyl worker (d. 1986) 
  1953   – Tony Blair, British politician, Prime Minister of the United Kingdom
  1953   – Michelle Courchesne, Canadian urban planner and politician, Deputy Premier of Quebec
  1953   – Ülle Rajasalu, Estonian politician
  1953   – Graeme Souness, Scottish international footballer and manager
1954 – Tom Abernethy, American basketball player
  1954   – Dora Bakoyannis, Greek politician, 120th Greek Minister for Foreign Affairs
  1954   – Angela Hernández Nuñez, Dominican author and poet
  1954   – Ain Lutsepp, Estonian actor and politician  
1955 – Nicholas Alexander, 7th Earl of Caledon, English politician, Lord Lieutenant of Armagh
  1955   – Tom Bergeron, American television host
  1955   – John Hutton, Baron Hutton of Furness, English academic and politician, Secretary of State for Defence
1956 – Lakis Lazopoulos, Greek actor and screenwriter
  1956   – Cindy Lovell, American educator and writer
  1956   – Roland Wieser, German race walker and coach
1958 – Randall Stout, American architect, designed the Taubman Museum of Art (d. 2014)
1959 – Andreas Busse, German runner
  1959   – Charles Hendry, English politician
1960 – Lyudmila Andonova, Bulgarian high jumper
  1960   – Keith Dowding, English political scientist, philosopher, and academic
  1960   – Roma Downey, Irish-American actress and producer
  1960   – John Flansburgh, American singer-songwriter and guitarist 
  1960   – Aleksei Lotman, Estonian biologist and politician
  1960   – Anne Parillaud, French actress
1961 – Oleksandr Apaychev, Ukrainian decathlete and coach
  1961   – George Clooney, American actor, director, producer, and screenwriter
  1961   – Tom Hunter, Scottish businessman and philanthropist
  1961   – Gina Riley, Australian actress, producer, and screenwriter
  1961   – Frans Timmermans, Dutch politician and diplomat, First Vice President of the European Commission
1962 – Tom Brake, English politician
  1962   – Brad Izzard, Australian rugby league player
1963 – Alessandra Ferri, Italian ballerina
1965 – Leslie Hope, Canadian actress, director, producer, and screenwriter
1968 – Worku Bikila, Ethiopian runner
  1968   – Lætitia Sadier, French singer and keyboard player 
1969 – Jim Magilton, Northern Irish footballer and manager
1970 – Roland Kun, Nauruan politician
  1970   – Kavan Smith, Canadian actor
1971 – Chris Shiflett, American singer-songwriter and guitarist 
1972 – Martin Brodeur, Canadian ice hockey player
  1972   – Naoko Takahashi, Japanese runner
1974 – Bernard Barmasai, Kenyan runner
  1974   – Daniela Bártová, Czech pole vaulter and gymnast
1975 – Alan Richardson, English cricketer and coach
1976 – Dean Chandler, English footballer
  1976   – Iván de la Peña, Spanish footballer 
1977 – Christophe Brandt, Belgian cyclist
  1977   – Marc Chouinard, Canadian ice hockey player
  1977   – Mark Eaton, American ice hockey player and coach
  1977   – Chantelle Newbery, Australian diver
1978 – John Abraham, American football player
  1978   – Tony Estanguet, French slalom canoeist
  1978   – Fredrick Federley, Swedish journalist and politician
  1978   – Alexandr Fedorov, Russian bodybuilder
1979 – Gerd Kanter, Estonian discus thrower
  1979   – Jan Erik Mikalsen, Norwegian composer
  1979   – Jon Montgomery, Canadian skeleton racer and television host
1980 – Brooke Bennett, American swimmer
  1980   – Dimitris Diamantidis, Greek professional basketball player
  1980   – Ricardo Oliveira, Brazilian footballer
  1980   – Matthew Whiley, English cricketer 
1982 – Jason Witten, American football player
1983 – Dani Alves, Brazilian footballer
  1983   – Ingrid Jonach, Australian author
  1983   – Doron Perkins, American basketball player
  1983   – Gabourey Sidibe, American actress
  1983   – Trinley Thaye Dorje, Tibetan religious leader, the 17th Karmapa Lama
  1983   – Fredrik Sjöström, Swedish ice hockey player
1984 – Anton Babchuk, Ukrainian ice hockey player
  1984   – Juan Pablo Carrizo, Argentinian footballer
1985 – Chris Paul, American basketball player
1986 – Goran Dragic, Slovenian basketball player
1987 – Dries Mertens, Belgian footballer 
  1987   – Meek Mill, American rapper
  1987   – Adrienne Warren, American actress
1988 – Ryan Anderson, American basketball player
  1988   – Dakota Kai, New Zealander professional wrestler
1989 – Dominika Cibulková, Slovak tennis player
  1989   – Jesse Hughes, Canadian DJ and producer
1990 – José Altuve, Venezuelan baseball player
1992 – Brendan Gallagher, Canadian ice hockey player
  1992   – Byun Baekhyun, South Korean musician and actor
  1992   – Jonas Valančiūnas, Lithuanian professional basketball player
1993 – Gustavo Gómez, Paraguayan footballer
1994 – Mateo Kovačić, Austrian-Croatian footballer
1997 – Duncan Scott, Scottish swimmer
2019 – Prince Archie of Sussex, né Archie Mountbatten-Windsor; British royal

Deaths

Pre-1600
 698 – Eadberht, bishop of Lindisfarne
 850 – Ninmyō, Japanese emperor (b. 808)
 932 – Qian Liu, Chinese warlord and king (b. 852)
 988 – Dirk II, count of Frisia and Holland
1002 – Ealdwulf, Archbishop of York, Abbot of Peterborough and Bishop of Worcester 
1187 – Ruben III, Prince of Armenia (b. 1145)
1236 – Roger of Wendover, Benedictine monk and chronicler
1471 – Edmund Beaufort, English commander (b. 1438)
1471 – Thomas Tresham, Speaker of the House of Commons
1475 – Dieric Bouts, Flemish painter (b. 1415)
1483 – Queen Jeonghui, Korean regent (b. 1418)
1502 – James Tyrrell, English knight (b. 1450)
1527 – Charles III, Duke of Bourbon, Count of Montpensier and Dauphin of Auvergne (b.1490)
1540 – Juan Luís Vives, Spanish scholar (b. 1492)
1596 – Giaches de Wert, Flemish-Italian composer (b. 1535)

1601–1900
1631 – Sir Robert Cotton, 1st Baronet, of Connington, English historian and politician, founded the Cotton library (b. 1570)
1638 – Cornelius Jansen, Dutch-French bishop and theologian (b. 1585)
1708 – François de Laval, French-Canadian bishop (b. 1623)
1757 – Charles FitzRoy, 2nd Duke of Grafton, English politician, Lord Lieutenant of Ireland (b. 1683)
  1757   – Kurt Christoph Graf von Schwerin, Prussian field marshal (b. 1684)
1782 – Christine Kirch, German astronomer and academic (b. 1696)
1840 – Francisco de Paula Santander, Colombian general and politician, 4th President of the Republic of the New Granada (b. 1792)
1859 – Alexander von Humboldt, German geographer and explorer (b. 1769)
1862 – Henry David Thoreau, American essayist, poet, and philosopher (b. 1817)
1867 – Socrates Nelson, American businessman and politician (b. 1814)
1877 – Johan Ludvig Runeberg, Swedish-Finnish poet and hymn-writer (b. 1804)
1882 – Thomas Henry Burke, Irish civil servant (b. 1829)
  1882   – Lord Frederick Cavendish, British politician, Chief Secretary for Ireland (b. 1836)

1901–present
1905 – Robert Herbert, English-Australian politician, 1st Premier of Queensland (b. 1831)
1907 – Emanuele Luigi Galizia, Maltese architect and civil engineer (b. 1830)
1910 – Edward VII of the United Kingdom (b. 1841)
1919 – L. Frank Baum,  American novelist (b. 1856)
1939 – Konstantin Somov, Russian-French painter and illustrator (b. 1869)
1949 – Maurice Maeterlinck, Belgian-French poet and playwright, Nobel Prize laureate (b. 1862)
1951 – Élie Cartan, French mathematician and physicist (b. 1869)
1952 – Maria Montessori, Italian-Dutch physician and educator (b. 1870)
1959 – Maria Dulęba, Polish actress (b. 1881)
  1959   – Ragnar Nurkse, Estonian-American economist and academic (b. 1907)
1961 – Lucian Blaga, Romanian poet, playwright, and philosopher (b. 1895)
1963 – Theodore von Kármán, Hungarian-American mathematician, physicist, and engineer (b. 1881)
  1963   – Ted Weems, American violinist, trombonist, and bandleader (b. 1901)
  1963   – Monty Woolley, American raconteur, actor, and  director (b. 1888)
1967 – Zhou Zuoren, Chinese author and translator (b. 1885)
1970 – Alexander Rodzyanko, Russian general (b. 1879)
1973 – Ernest MacMillan, Canadian conductor and composer (b. 1893)
1975 – József Mindszenty, Hungarian cardinal (b. 1892)
1980 – María Luisa Bombal, Chilean writer (b. 1910)
1983 – Ezra Jack Keats, American author and illustrator (b. 1916)
  1983   – Kai Winding, Danish-American trombonist and composer (b. 1922)
1984 – Mary Cain, American journalist and politician (b. 1904)
  1984   – Bonner Pink, English politician (b. 1912)
1987 – William J. Casey, American politician, 13th Director of Central Intelligence (b. 1913)
1989 – Earl Blaik, American football player and coach (b. 1897)
1990 – Charles Farrell, American actor (b. 1900)
1991 – Wilfrid Hyde-White, English actor (b. 1903)
1992 – Marlene Dietrich, German-American actress and singer (b. 1901)
1993 – Ann Todd, English actress and producer (b. 1909)
1995 – Noel Brotherston, Northern Irish footballer (b. 1956)
2000 – Gordon McClymont, Australian ecologist and academic (b. 1920)
2002 – Murray Adaskin, Canadian violinist, composer, conductor, and educator (b. 1906)
  2002   – Otis Blackwell, American singer-songwriter and pianist (b. 1932)
  2002   – Pim Fortuyn, Dutch sociologist, academic, and politician (b. 1948)
  2002   – Bjørn Johansen, Norwegian saxophonist (b. 1940)
2003 – Art Houtteman, American baseball player and journalist (b. 1927)
2004 – Virginia Capers, American actress and singer (b. 1925)
  2004   – Philip Kapleau, American monk and educator (b. 1912)
  2004   – Barney Kessel, American guitarist and composer (b. 1923)
2006 – Grant McLennan, Australian singer-songwriter and guitarist (b. 1958)
  2006   – Lorne Saxberg, Canadian journalist (b. 1958)
2007 – Enéas Carneiro, Brazilian physician and politician (b. 1938)
  2007   – Curtis Harrington, American actor, director, and screenwriter (b. 1926)
2009 – Kevin Grubb, American race car driver (b. 1978)
2010 – Robin Roberts, American baseball player, coach, and sportscaster (b. 1926)
2012 – James R. Browning, American lieutenant, lawyer, and judge (b. 1918)
  2012   – James Isaac, American director and producer (b. 1960)
  2012   – Jean Laplanche, French psychoanalyst and author (b. 1924)
2013 – Giulio Andreotti, Italian journalist and politician, 41st Prime Minister of Italy (b. 1919)
  2013   – Severo Aparicio Quispe, Peruvian bishop (b. 1923)
  2013   – Michelangelo Spensieri, Italian-Canadian lawyer and politician (b. 1949)
2014 – Wil Albeda, Dutch economist and politician, Dutch Minister of Social Affairs (b. 1925)
  2014   – William H. Dana, American pilot, engineer, and astronaut (b. 1930)
  2014   – Jimmy Ellis, American boxer (b. 1940)
  2014   – Billy Harrell, American baseball player and scout (b. 1928)
  2014   – Antony Hopkins, English pianist, composer, and conductor (b. 1921)
  2014   – Maria Lassnig, Austrian painter and academic (b. 1919)
  2014   – Farley Mowat, Canadian environmentalist and author (b. 1921)
2015 – Novera Ahmed, Bangladeshi sculptor (b. 1930)
  2015   – Denise McCluggage, American race car driver and journalist (b. 1927)
  2015   – Jim Wright, American soldier, lawyer, and politician, 56th Speaker of the United States House of Representatives (b. 1922)
2016 – Patrick Ekeng, Cameroonian footballer (b. 1990)
  2016   – Reg Grundy, Australian businessman (b. 1923)
2021   – Kentaro Miura, Japanese manga artist (b. 1966)
2022 – George Pérez, American comic book artist and writer (b. 1954)

Holidays and observances
Christian feast day:
Dominic Savio
Evodius of Antioch (Roman Catholic Church)
François de Laval
Gerard of Lunel
Lucius of Cyrene
Petronax of Monte Cassino
St George's Day related observances (Eastern Orthodox Church):
Day of Bravery, also known as Gergyovden (Bulgaria)
Đurđevdan (Gorani, Roma)
Police Day (Georgia)
Yuri's Day in the Spring (Russian Orthodox Church)
St John before the Latin Gate
May 6 (Eastern Orthodox liturgics)
Earliest day on which Military Spouse Day can fall, while May 12 is the latest; celebrated on Friday before Mother's Day (United States)
International No Diet Day
Martyrs' Day (Gabon)
Martyrs' Day (Lebanon and Syria)
National Azulejo Day (Portugal)
Teachers' Day (Jamaica)
The first day of Hıdırellez (Turkey)

References

External links

 BBC: On This Day
 
 Historical Events on May 6

Days of the year
May